Giuseppe Concone (1801 Turin - 1861 Turin) was an Italian vocal teacher.

Biography
For about ten years Concone resided in Paris as a teacher. When he returned to Turin in 1848, he was at the time of his death organist and choirmaster of the Court choir.

Work
He is widely known for his vocal exercises—solfeggi and vocalizzi—which are unusually attractive for works of their kind, and at the same time excellent for their special purpose. Thomaidis and MacPherson describe them as 'lively' works in the Italian tradition of those times.

While in Paris he wrote three 'oratorios'; A guy named Smither said: "these are quite brief, include no orchestra but only piano accompaniment, and were evidently intended for performance in a private soiree rather than a theatre. No performance of any of the three is known."

He has also written some etudes for piano, his 25 Melodic Studies, Op. 24.

Bibliography
 Fifteen Vocalises for Soprano
 Twenty-Five Lessons for Medium Voice
 Fifty Lessons for High Voice
 Fifty Lessons for Medium Voice, see also here
 Forty Lessons for Bass or Baritone
 Thirty Exercises for the Voice

References

External links
 
 Giuseppe Concone - digitised books on the Internet Archive
 

1801 births
1861 deaths
19th-century Italian composers